Bateman is a surname. Notable people and characters with the name include:

Ahmad Bateman (born 1961), professional golfer
Alan Mara Bateman (1889–1971), Canadian-American economic geologist
Angus John Bateman (1919–1996), English geneticist
Brian Bateman (born 1973), professional golfer
C. Donald Bateman (born 1932), Inventor and inductee on the National Inventors Hall of Fame
Charles Bateman (actor) (born 1928), Scottish-born actor on American television
Charles Bateman (1863–1947), English architect
 Christian Henry Bateman (1813–1889), English minister and hymn writer
Christopher Bateman (born 1957), American politician
Colin Bateman (born 1962), author and journalist; also known mononymously as Bateman
H. M. Bateman (1887–1970), British humorous artist and cartoonist
Harry Bateman (1882–1946), English mathematician
Harry Bateman (artist) (1896–1976), English landscape painter
Hezekiah Linthicum Bateman (1812-1875), American actor and manager
Jaime Bateman Cayón (1940-1983), Colombian guerrilla leader
James Bateman (artist) (1893–1959), British painter
James Bateman (1811–1897), British botanist and horticulturist
Jason Bateman (born 1969), actor
John Bateman (1789–1855), Australian settler was postmaster, general store owner and an investor
John Bateman (born 1993), rugby league player
John Frederic La Trobe Bateman (1810–1889), British civil engineer
Justine Bateman (born 1966), actress
Mary Bateman (1768-1809), English criminal and alleged witch known as the Yorkshire Witch
Merrill J. Bateman (born 1936), leader of The Church of Jesus Christ of Latter-day Saints and former Brigham Young University President
Paul T. Bateman (1919-2012), American mathematician
Rashod Bateman (born 1999), American football player
Raymond Bateman (1927-2016), American politician
Richard Bateman (born 1958), British botanist
Robert Bateman (disambiguation), multiple people
Sarah Blake Bateman (born 1990) Icelandic swimmer
Thomas Bateman (disambiguation), multiple people
Victor Bateman (1904-1972), Australian rules footballer
Victoria Bateman (born 1979), British feminist and academic economist
Victory Bateman (1885–1926), American film actress
Viscount Bateman, 18th-century British peers
William Bateman (disambiguation), multiple people

Fictional characters
Danny Bateman, a character in the football film The Replacements
Patrick Bateman, a recurring character in the works of Bret Easton Ellis and protagonist of the book American Psycho
Sean Bateman, brother of Patrick Bateman and one of the three main characters in The Rules of Attraction

See also
 Bateman (disambiguation)

English-language surnames